The Château de Francs is a château in Bègles, Gironde, Nouvelle-Aquitaine, France.

Châteaux in Gironde